Bela is a village in the Adilabad district, the northernmost district in the state of Telangana in south India.

Geography

See also
Adilabad district
List of mandals in Telangana

References

External links
Maps of India: Adilabad District Map (Telangana)

Villages in Adilabad district